Nyctophila reichii, the Mediterranean firefly, is a species of firefly. The species is very common in the southern and eastern part of the Iberian Peninsula.

References

External links
 Gusanos de luz. ¿Has visto una luciérnaga? 

Lampyridae
Bioluminescent insects
Beetles described in 1859
Beetles of Europe